Pungsan Station is a railway station on the Gyeongui-Jungang Line in South Korea.

External links
 Station information from Korail

Seoul Metropolitan Subway stations
Railway stations opened in 2009
Metro stations in Goyang